The occidental gerbil (Gerbillus occiduus) is distributed mainly southwestern Morocco.  Less than 250 individuals of this species are thought to persist in the wild.

References

Gerbillus
Rodents of North Africa
Endemic fauna of Morocco
Mammals described in 1975